Charlene Woitha (born 21 August 1993) is a German athlete who specialises in the hammer throw. She qualified for 2016 Summer Olympics. She finished in 29th place in the qualifying round and did not advance to the final.

Personal bests

References

External links 
 
 
 
 

1993 births
Living people
German female hammer throwers
Olympic female hammer throwers
Olympic athletes of Germany
Athletes (track and field) at the 2016 Summer Olympics
German national athletics champions